The Nicolson Institute (Gaelic: Àrd-sgoil MhicNeacail) in Stornoway, is the largest school in the Western Isles, Scotland.

The Nicolson is the only six-year secondary school in Lewis. With the Sir E. Scott School in Harris, they provide education up to Advanced Higher level.

The student population is around 1000. The school has Gaelic-speaking pupils, although these are in the minority. There are five houses, named after five significant former rectors: Addison, Forbes, Gibson, Macrae and Sutherland. Addison contains only pupils who claim to be fluent in Gaelic.

The former rector, Dr. Frances Murray is an alumnus of the school and also a former dux of the school. She is the first former pupil to be appointed to the post in the school's history.

The Nicolson was re-built on the site of the original Stornoway Primary next to where the old Nicolson was. The old school comprised several different buildings, all built between 1904 (Matheson Hall) and the Main Building (1957) as well as a few other building that were demolished in the 1980s. The Main building was extended many times and a canteen was built in a second neighbouring building in the 1980s.

New School 
In June 2010, the first part of the new school project started with the Springfield South (maths & geography) was demolished, (these subjects were housed in temporary portacabins at the back of the school). The project took 2 years and the new school opened on 16 August 2012 to staff and pupils. The old main building was then demolished to become the new bus park. The technical (Springfield North) and former Religious studies department (Matheson Hall) were retained, (technical is joint to the new building by a tunnel and Matheson hall is now used by the council.

Controversies 
In 2006 the school was the site of an international custody battle after first year pupil Misbah Rana (also known as Molly Campbell) absconded to Pakistan.

In 2010, a cage/enclosure intended as a play area for a severely autistic pupil was removed, with the local authority claiming that the supplier had not understood the requirements.

The school has been at the center of multiple bullying controversies.
 
In 1997 two pupils were convicted after their bullying victim took her own life.
In 2006 a pupil spoke out about anti-English bullying she had experienced at the school 
In 2018 video of another bullying incident went viral 

In 2017 a student at the school committed suicide on school premises; his parents sued the health board for providing what they say is an inaccurate diagnosis from unsuitable tests.
Eight months later another pupil committed suicide amid what was described as an 'epidemic' of mental health issues within the school.

In September 2019, a teacher at the school was charged with sexual offenses.

Notable Pupils 

 Linda Norgrove, kidnapped by the Taliban in Afghanistan, and killed in rescue effort.
 Angus MacNeil (born 1970), Scottish National Party (SNP) Member of Parliament (MP) for Na h-Eileanan an Iar since 2005
Anne MacKenzie (journalist) (born 1960), BBC political and current affairs presenter

Notes

External links
Nicolson Institute Homepage
Nicolson Institute's page on Scottish Schools Online

 https://www.bbc.co.uk/news/uk-scotland-highlands-islands-49126068https://www.bbc.co.uk/news/uk-scotland-highlands-islands-42337676

Stornoway
Secondary schools in the Outer Hebrides
Scottish Gaelic-language secondary schools
Buildings and structures in the Isle of Lewis
1873 establishments in Scotland
Educational institutions established in 1873